Camporotondo di Fiastrone is a comune (municipality) of about 580 inhabitants in the Province of Macerata in the Italian region Marche, located about  southwest of Ancona and about  southwest of Macerata.

Camporotondo di Fiastrone borders the following municipalities: Belforte del Chienti, Caldarola, Cessapalombo, San Ginesio, Tolentino.

Just east of the town is the Franciscan Convent of Colfano.

References

Cities and towns in the Marche